The polka-dot cusk-eel (Otophidium omostigma), is a species of ray-finned fish found in the Western Atlantic.

Description 

Its body is short and flattened. It has brown colored spots around its body and also a black spot around the gills and the dorsal fin. It's anal fins is broad and black.

References 

Ophidiidae
Fish described in 1882